The Australian Nursing and Midwifery Federation (ANMF) is the largest union in Australia, with 274,956 members in 2018. The union is run by nurses, midwives and assistants in nursing to advance the industrial, political and professional interests of its members.

Established in 1924, the union was previously known as the Australian Nursing Federation. It is a federated union, with branches in each state and territory in Australia.

Leadership 
All of the federal executive officers of the ANMF are qualified nurses and/or midwives.

The ANMF has more than 249,000 members, employed in a wide range of enterprises in urban, rural and remote locations in both in the public and the private sectors, including hospitals, health and community services, schools, universities, aged care, GP clinics, schools, the armed forces, statutory authorities, local government, offshore territories and industry.

Campaigns 
The ANMF runs campaigns for all members throughout Australia, such as its ongoing campaign to legally mandate staffing ratios for aged care.

The ANMF has a range of national policies, guidelines, and position statements on nursing, health, and social justice issues for the guidance of members in their practice and at their workplaces.

Federal structure 
The ANMF is federally registered. Most branches also have a state-registered union, operating as the union in the state industrial relations system. The NSW branch operates as the New South Wales Nurses and Midwives' Association; the Queensland branch operates as the Queensland Nurses and Midwives' Union.

International representation 
The ANMF represents Australian nursing internationally through links with other national and international nursing organisations, professional associations and the International Labour Organisations. The ANMF is a member of the Commonwealth Nurses and Midwives Federation and the South Pacific Nurses Forum and is affiliated to the Australian Council of Trade Unions, International Centre for Trade Union Rights, and APHEDA, also known as Union Aid Abroad, the overseas aid agency of the Australian trade union movement.

References

External links
 ANMF website

Nursing organisations in Australia
Trade unions established in 1924
Healthcare trade unions in Australia
1924 establishments in Australia
National Rural Health Alliance organisations
Australian Public Sector Trade Unions